The 1996 Bournemouth International (also known as the 1996 Samsung Open for sponsorship reasons) was a men's tennis tournament played on outdoor clay courts at the West Hants Tennis Club in Bournemouth in England and was part of the World Series of the 1996 ATP Tour. It was the inaugural edition of the tournament and was held from 9 to 15 September 1996. Albert Costa won the singles title.

Finals

Singles

 Albert Costa defeated  Marc-Kevin Goellner 6–7(4–7), 6–2, 6–2
 It was Costa's 3rd title of the year and the 4th of his career.

Doubles

 Marc-Kevin Goellner /  Greg Rusedski defeated  Rodolphe Gilbert /  Nuno Marques 6–3, 7–6
 It was Goellner's 1st title of the year and the 4th of his career. It was Rusedski's 1st title of the year and the 4th of his career.

Bournemouth International
Brighton International
Sport in Bournemouth
Bright